The Division of Dickson is an Australian Electoral Division in Queensland, Australia.

Dickson includes the suburbs of Kurwongbah, Petrie, Strathpine, Albany Creek, Ferny Hills, Everton Hills, Murrumba Downs and parts of Kallangur. The electorate also includes Lake Samsonvale and Lake Kurwongbah and covers 724 square kilometres.

History 

The division was formed in 1992 and is named after Sir James Dickson, a leading advocate in Australian Federation, Premier of Queensland and Minister for Defence in the first Australian ministry.

1993 election
There was an unusual circumstance at the 1993 election. The seat had been carved out of most of the Brisbane portion of the Sunshine Coast-based seat of Fisher, making it a natural choice for that seat's Labor MP, Michael Lavarch, to transfer ahead of the 1993 election.

However, one of the candidates, an independent, died very shortly before the election, making it necessary to hold a standalone 'supplementary election' on 17 April (the rest of the country had already voted on 13 March). Following Labor's reelection, the Prime Minister Paul Keating announced the makeup of the Second Keating ministry to be sworn in on 24 March, but kept the portfolio of Attorney-General open for Lavarch subject to him winning Dickson on 17 April. He won the seat, and was appointed to the ministry on 27 April.

Boundaries
Since 1984, federal electoral division boundaries in Australia have been determined at redistributions by a redistribution committee appointed by the Australian Electoral Commission. Redistributions occur for the boundaries of divisions in a particular state, and they occur every seven years, or sooner if a state's representation entitlement changes or when divisions of a state are malapportioned.

The division is located in the outer north-western suburbs of Brisbane, including Albany Creek, Kallangur and Strathpine. The 2006 redistribution added the Shire of Esk to and removed part of Kallangur from the seat. It has historically been a marginal seat, changing hands between the Australian Labor Party and the Liberal Party.

Members

Election results

References

External links
 Division of Dickson (Qld) — Australian Electoral Commission

Electoral divisions of Australia
Constituencies established in 1993
1993 establishments in Australia
Dickson
Shire of Pine Rivers